The February 8 Jiktong Coal Mine(2.8직동청년탄광) is a coal mine in North Korea. The mine is located in South Pyongan Province. It is part of the Sunchon Area Youth Coal-mining Complex. The mine has coal reserves amounting to 330 million tonnes of lignite, one of the largest lignite reserves in Asia, and it produces 1 million tonnes of coal per year.

References 

Coal mines in North Korea